Malaquias is a given name and surname of Hispanic origin.

People with the given name
 Malaquías Concha (1859–1921), Chilean writer, lawyer and politician
 Malaquías Montoya (born 1938), American born Chicano poster artist

People with the surname
 Arturo Malaquias (born 1975), Mexican long-distance runner
 Diogo Malaquías (born 1988), Brazilian footballer
 Florbela Malaquias (born 1959), Angolan politician

See also
 Malaquin

Masculine given names
Surnames of Mexican origin
Surnames of Spanish origin
Surnames of Portuguese origin